Legislative elections were held in France between 9 and 16 April 1799 to elect one-third of the members of the Council of Five Hundred and the Council of Ancients, the lower and upper houses of the legislature.

Background
Following the Coup of 11 May 1798 (22 Floréal year VI in the Republican calendar), the small Jacobin minority led by Generals Jean-Antoine Marbot and Jean-Baptiste Jourdan harassed the Directory, with the occasional support of directorial deputies exasperated by the encroachments of the executive.  The opposition to the Jacobins continues to grow with the deteriorating situation of the War of the Second Coalition.  In messidor, they manage to form a small coalition government, forming a majority in the Council of the Five Hundred to refuse the Directory to complete the court of cessation, even if the Council of Elders voted in their prerogative.

After the loss of Italy, the Minister of War, Barthélemy Louis Joseph Schérer, was accused of (what would be considered corruption today) and was brought before a commission of inquiry.  It was on this occasion that Lucien Bonaparte asserts himself in the political scene and a leader of the opponents of the left, though not a devoted Jacobin.

In this context, the Director does not dare to organise and election under the same pressure it had felt in the 1798 election.  If the council was to be seen as promoting the election of candidates of the government, the policy of appeasement and peace could continue.

Results
During the electoral processes, 27 departments experienced splits from the 25 in the 1798 election, and the assemblies were less troubled than the last election.  Participation in the election however, fell to just 11.5% of the national vote, against 20% of the vote in 1798.  In Alsace for instance, the vote fell from 30% to just 15%.  Of the 79 members supported by the government, 43 are beaten.  This also the case for the 39 of the 64 new official candidates for government.  In addition, out of 44 candidates recommended by one or other directors, only 6 were elected.

Unlike the 1798 election, the Council validates majority assemblies in the departments which have experienced a split, except in Deux-Nèthes, where the elections are cancelled because the required turnout is not met.  This "non-election" also occurs in Bouches-du-Rhône, where many irregularities are noted by the local assemblies.

The 1799 election ended with a massive victory for the left-wing republican Montagnards.  However, the Royalist parties, the Clichy Club (moderate constitutionalists) and Ultra-Royalists (absolute monarchists) won almost half of the seats within the council.  The Extreme Left Group (Groupe de Extrême-Gauche) also won their first group of seats in the election.

The 1799 election would end up being the last parliamentary election in France until the May 1815 legislative election.

Footnotes

References 

1799 events of the French Revolution
18th-century elections in Europe
18th-century elections in France
French Directory
Legislative elections in France